The Luhn mod N algorithm is an extension to the Luhn algorithm (also known as mod 10 algorithm) that allows it to work with sequences of values in any even-numbered base. This can be useful when a check digit is required to validate an identification string composed of letters, a combination of letters and digits or any arbitrary set of  characters where  is divisible by 2.

Informal explanation 

The Luhn mod N algorithm generates a check digit (more precisely, a check character) within the same range of valid characters as the input string. For example, if the algorithm is applied to a string of lower-case letters (a to z), the check character will also be a lower-case letter. Apart from this distinction, it resembles very closely the original algorithm.

The main idea behind the extension is that the full set of valid input characters is mapped to a list of code-points (i.e., sequential integers beginning with zero). The algorithm processes the input string by converting each character to its associated code-point and then performing the computations in mod N (where  is the number of valid input characters). Finally, the resulting check code-point is mapped back to obtain its corresponding check character.

Limitation 

The Luhn mod N algorithm only works where  is divisible by 2. This is because there is an operation to correct the value of a position after doubling its value which does not work where  is not divisable by 2. For applications using the English alphabet this is not a problem, since a string of lower-case letters has 26 code-points, and adding Decimal characters adds a further 10, maintaining an  divisible by 2.

Explanation 

The second step in the Luhn algorithm re-packs the doubled value of a position into the original digit's base by adding together the individual digits in the doubled value when written in base . For example, in Decimal applications where  is 10, original values between 0 and 4 result in even numbers and original values between 5 and 9 result in odd numbers, effectively re-packing the doubled values between 0 and 18 into a single distinct result between 0 and 9.

Outcome 

As these detection capabilities are the algorithm's primary strengths, the algorithm is weakened almost entirely by this limitation.

Mapping characters to code-points 

Initially, a mapping between valid input characters and code-points must be created. For example, consider that the valid characters are the lower-case letters from a to f. Therefore, a suitable mapping would be:

Note that the order of the characters is completely irrelevant. This other mapping would also be acceptable (although possibly more cumbersome to implement):

It is also possible to intermix letters and digits (and possibly even other characters). For example, this mapping would be appropriate for lower-case hexadecimal digits:

Algorithm in C# 

Assuming the following functions are defined:

int CodePointFromCharacter(char character) {...}

char CharacterFromCodePoint(int codePoint) {...}

int NumberOfValidInputCharacters() {...}

The function to generate a check character is:

char GenerateCheckCharacter(string input)
{
    int factor = 2;
    int sum = 0;
    int n = NumberOfValidInputCharacters();

    // Starting from the right and working leftwards is easier since
    // the initial "factor" will always be "2".
    for (int i = input.Length - 1; i >= 0; i--)
    {
        int codePoint = CodePointFromCharacter(input[i]);
        int addend = factor * codePoint;

        // Alternate the "factor" that each "codePoint" is multiplied by
        factor = (factor == 2) ? 1 : 2;

        // Sum the digits of the "addend" as expressed in base "n"
        addend = IntegerValue(addend / n) + (addend % n);
        sum += addend;
    }

    // Calculate the number that must be added to the "sum"
    // to make it divisible by "n".
    int remainder = sum % n;
    int checkCodePoint = (n - remainder) % n;

    return CharacterFromCodePoint(checkCodePoint);
}

And the function to validate a string (with the check character as the last character) is:

bool ValidateCheckCharacter(string input)
{
    int factor = 1;
    int sum = 0;
    int n = NumberOfValidInputCharacters();

    // Starting from the right, work leftwards
    // Now, the initial "factor" will always be "1"
    // since the last character is the check character.
    for (int i = input.Length - 1; i >= 0; i--)
    {
        int codePoint = CodePointFromCharacter(input[i]);
        int addend = factor * codePoint;

        // Alternate the "factor" that each "codePoint" is multiplied by
        factor = (factor == 2) ? 1 : 2;

        // Sum the digits of the "addend" as expressed in base "n"
        addend = IntegerValue(addend / n) + (addend % n);
        sum += addend;
    }

    int remainder = sum % n;

    return (remainder == 0);
}

Algorithm in Java 

Assuming the following functions are defined:

int codePointFromCharacter(char character) {...}

char characterFromCodePoint(int codePoint) {...}

int numberOfValidInputCharacters() {...}

The function to generate a check character is:

char generateCheckCharacter(String input) {
    int factor = 2;
    int sum = 0;
    int n = numberOfValidInputCharacters();

    // Starting from the right and working leftwards is easier since
    // the initial "factor" will always be "2".
    for (int i = input.length() - 1; i >= 0; i--) {
        int codePoint = codePointFromCharacter(input.charAt(i));
        int addend = factor * codePoint;

        // Alternate the "factor" that each "codePoint" is multiplied by
        factor = (factor == 2) ? 1 : 2;

        // Sum the digits of the "addend" as expressed in base "n"
        addend = (addend / n) + (addend % n);
        sum += addend;
    }

    // Calculate the number that must be added to the "sum"
    // to make it divisible by "n".
    int remainder = sum % n;
    int checkCodePoint = (n - remainder) % n;

    return characterFromCodePoint(checkCodePoint);
}

And the function to validate a string (with the check character as the last character) is:

boolean validateCheckCharacter(String input) {
    int factor = 1;
    int sum = 0;
    int n = numberOfValidInputCharacters();

    // Starting from the right, work leftwards
    // Now, the initial "factor" will always be "1"
    // since the last character is the check character.
    for (int i = input.length() - 1; i >= 0; i--) {
        int codePoint = codePointFromCharacter(input.charAt(i));
        int addend = factor * codePoint;

        // Alternate the "factor" that each "codePoint" is multiplied by
        factor = (factor == 2) ? 1 : 2;

        // Sum the digits of the "addend" as expressed in base "n"
        addend = (addend / n) + (addend % n);
        sum += addend;
    }

    int remainder = sum % n;

    return (remainder == 0);
}

Algorithm in JavaScript 

Assuming the following functions are defined:

const codePoints = "0123456789ABCDEFGHIJKLMNOPQRSTUVWXYZ";
//This can be any string of permitted characters

function numberOfValidInputCharacters() {
    return codePoints.length;
}

function codePointFromCharacter(character) {
    return codePoints.indexOf(character);
}

function characterFromCodePoint(codePoint) {
    return codePoints.charAt(codePoint);
}

The function to generate a check character is:

function generateCheckCharacter(input) {
    let factor = 2;
    let sum = 0;
    let n = numberOfValidInputCharacters();

    // Starting from the right and working leftwards is easier since
    // the initial "factor" will always be "2".
    for (let i = input.length - 1; i >= 0; i--) {
        let codePoint = codePointFromCharacter(input.charAt(i));
        let addend = factor * codePoint;

        // Alternate the "factor" that each "codePoint" is multiplied by
        factor = (factor == 2) ? 1 : 2;

        // Sum the digits of the "addend" as expressed in base "n"
        addend = (Math.floor(addend / n)) + (addend % n);
        sum += addend;
    }

    // Calculate the number that must be added to the "sum"
    // to make it divisible by "n".
    let remainder = sum % n;
    let checkCodePoint = (n - remainder) % n;
    return characterFromCodePoint(checkCodePoint);
}

And the function to validate a string (with the check character as the last character) is:

function validateCheckCharacter(input) {
    let factor = 1;
    let sum = 0;
    let n = numberOfValidInputCharacters();

    // Starting from the right, work leftwards
    // Now, the initial "factor" will always be "1"
    // since the last character is the check character.
    for (let i = input.length - 1; i >= 0; i--) {
        let codePoint = codePointFromCharacter(input.charAt(i));
        let addend = factor * codePoint;

        // Alternate the "factor" that each "codePoint" is multiplied by
        factor = (factor == 2) ? 1 : 2;

        // Sum the digits of the "addend" as expressed in base "n"
        addend = (Math.floor(addend / n)) + (addend % n);
        sum += addend;
    }
    let remainder = sum % n;
    return (remainder == 0);
}

Example

Generation 

Consider the above set of valid input characters and the example input string . To generate the check character, start with the last character in the string and move left doubling every other  code-point. The "digits" of the code-points as written in base 6 (since there are 6 valid input characters) should then be summed up:

The total sum of digits is 14 (0 + 2 + 2 + 1 + 4 + 5). The number that must be added to obtain the next multiple of 6 (in this case, 18) is 4. This is the resulting check code-point. The associated check character is e.

Validation 

The resulting string  can then be validated by using a similar procedure:

The total sum of digits is 18. Since it is divisible by 6, the check character is valid.

Implementation 

The mapping of characters to code-points and back can be implemented in a number of ways. The simplest approach (akin to the original Luhn algorithm) is to use ASCII code arithmetic. For example, given an input set of 0 to 9, the code-point can be calculated by subtracting the ASCII code for '0' from the ASCII code of the desired character. The reverse operation will provide the reverse mapping. Additional ranges of characters can be dealt with by using conditional statements.

Non-sequential sets can be mapped both ways using a hard-coded switch/case statement. A more flexible approach is to use something similar to an associative array. For this to work, a pair of arrays is required to provide the two-way mapping.

An additional possibility is to use an array of characters where the array indexes are the code-points associated with each character. The mapping from character to code-point can then be performed with a linear or binary search. In this case, the reverse mapping is just a simple array lookup.

Weakness 

This extension shares the same weakness as the original algorithm, namely, it cannot detect the transposition of the sequence <first-valid-character><last-valid-character> to <last-valid-character><first-valid-character> (or vice versa). This is equivalent to the transposition of 09 to 90 (assuming a set of valid input characters from 0 to 9 in order). On a positive note, the larger the set of valid input characters, the smaller the impact of the weakness.

See also 
 International Securities Identification Number (ISIN)

Modular arithmetic
Checksum algorithms
Articles with example code
Articles with example C Sharp code